Clare is a city in Webster County, Iowa, United States. The population was 136 at the 2020 census. Clare was settled circa 1882 by immigrants from Clare County, Ireland. Clare is also home to a United States post office on West Front St.

Geography
Clare is located at  (42.587838, -94.343526).

Clare lies within the eastern side of Manson crater, an impact structure buried by glacial till and outwash.

Demographics

2010 census
As of the census of 2010, there were 146 people, 65 households, and 41 families living in the city. The racial makeup of the city was 97.3% White, 2.1% African American, and 0.7% from other races. Hispanic or Latino of any race were 1.4% of the population.

There were 65 households, of which 21.5% had children under the age of 18 living with them, 53.8% were married couples living together, 7.7% had a female householder with no husband present, 1.5% had a male householder with no wife present, and 36.9% were non-families. 30.8% of all households were made up of individuals, and 15.4% had someone living alone who was 65 years of age or older. The average household size was 2.25 and the average family size was 2.80.

The median age in the city was 42.5 years. 19.2% of residents were under the age of 18; 9% were between the ages of 18 and 24; 23.2% were from 25 to 44; 30% were from 45 to 64; and 18.5% were 65 years of age or older. The gender makeup of the city was 53.4% male and 46.6% female.

2000 census
As of the census of 2000, there were 190 people, 79 households, and 50 families living in the city. The racial makeup of the city was 98.42% White, 0.53% Native American, and 1.05% from two or more races.

There were 79 households, out of which 29.1% had children under the age of 18 living with them, 50.6% were married couples living together, 3.8% had a female householder with no husband present, and 36.7% were non-families. 29.1% of all households were made up of individuals, and 15.2% had someone living alone who was 65 years of age or older. The average household size was 2.41 and the average family size was 3.00.

In the city, the population was spread out, with 25.3% under the age of 18, 8.9% from 18 to 24, 23.7% from 25 to 44, 25.3% from 45 to 64, and 16.8% who were 65 years of age or older. The median age was 41 years. For every 100 females, there were 106.5 males. For every 100 females age 18 and over, there were 108.8 males.

The median income for a household in the city was $24,500, and the median income for a family was $40,000. Males had a median income of $31,875 versus $20,833 for females. The per capita income for the city was $13,838. None of the families and 6.0% of the population were living below the poverty line.

Education
The Manson–Northwest Webster Community School District serves the community. It was established on July 1, 1993, with the merger of the Manson and Northwest Webster districts.

References

External links
http://www.celticcousins.net/irishiniowa/clarehistory.htm History of Clare

Cities in Iowa
Cities in Webster County, Iowa
Populated places established in 1882
Irish-American history
Irish-American culture in Iowa